Westlock (Hnatko Farms) Aerodrome  is located  west of Westlock, Alberta, Canada.

References

Registered aerodromes in Alberta
Westlock County